Giovanni Cavalcanti may refer to:

 Giovanni Cavalcanti (chronicler) (1381–c. 1451), chronicler of Florence
 Giovanni Cavalcanti (cyclist) (born 1943), Italian cyclist
 Giovanni Cavalcanti (poet) (1444–1509), Italian poet from Florence